Manifest destiny was a cultural belief in the 19th-century United States that American settlers were destined to expand across North America. 

There were three basic tenets to the concept:
 The special virtues of the American people and their institutions
 The mission of the United States to redeem and remake the West in the image of the agrarian East
 An irresistible destiny to accomplish this essential duty

Historian William Weeks, describing American foreign policy in the early 19th century, wrote: "The rhetoric of American empire comprises three main aspects: the assumption of the unique moral virtue of the United States, the assertion of its mission to redeem the world by the spread of republican government and more generally the 'American way of life', and the faith in the nation's divinely ordained destiny to succeed in this mission."

Other historians have emphasized that "manifest destiny" was always contested; many endorsed the idea, but the large majority of Whigs and many prominent Americans (such as Abraham Lincoln and Ulysses S. Grant) rejected the concept. Historian Daniel Walker Howe writes, "American imperialism did not represent an American consensus; it provoked bitter dissent within the national polity while the Whigs saw America's moral mission as one of democratic example rather than conquest. The term was used by the then-Democrats in the 1840s to justify the Mexican–American War, and it was also used to negotiate the Oregon boundary dispute. Historian Frederick Merk says manifest destiny always limped along because of its internal limitations and the issue of slavery, and never became a national priority of the United States. By 1843, former U.S. President John Quincy Adams, originally a major supporter of the concept underlying manifest destiny, had changed his mind and repudiated expansionism because it meant the expansion of slavery in Texas.

Newspaper editor John O'Sullivan is generally credited with coining the term manifest destiny in 1845 to describe the essence of this mindset; other historians believe the unsigned editorial titled "Annexation" in which it first appeared was written by journalist and annexation advocate Jane Cazneau.

Context 
There was never a set of principles defining manifest destiny; it was always a general idea rather than a specific policy made with a motto. Ill-defined but keenly felt, manifest destiny was an expression of conviction in the morality and value of expansionism that complemented other popular ideas of the era, including American exceptionalism and Romantic nationalism. Andrew Jackson, who spoke of "extending the area of freedom", typified the conflation of America's potential greatness, the nation's budding sense of Romantic self-identity, and its expansion.

Yet Jackson would not be the only president to elaborate on the principles underlying manifest destiny. Owing in part to the lack of a definitive narrative outlining its rationale, proponents offered divergent or seemingly conflicting viewpoints. While many writers focused primarily upon American expansionism, be it into Mexico or across the Pacific, others saw the term as a call to example. Without an agreed-upon interpretation, much less an elaborated political philosophy, these conflicting views of America's destiny were never resolved. This variety of possible meanings was summed up by Ernest Lee Tuveson: "A vast complex of ideas, policies, and actions is comprehended under the phrase 'Manifest Destiny'. They are not, as we should expect, all compatible, nor do they come from any one source."

Etymology

Journalist John L. O'Sullivan was an influential advocate for Jacksonian democracy and a complex character, described by Julian Hawthorne as "always full of grand and world-embracing schemes". O'Sullivan wrote an article in 1839 that, while not using the term "manifest destiny", did predict a "divine destiny" for the United States based upon values such as equality, rights of conscience, and personal enfranchisement "to establish on earth the moral dignity and salvation of man". This destiny was not explicitly territorial, but O'Sullivan predicted that the United States would be one of a "Union of many Republics" sharing those values.

Six years later, in 1845, O'Sullivan wrote another essay titled Annexation in the Democratic Review, in which he first used the phrase manifest destiny. In this article he urged the U.S. to annex the Republic of Texas, not only because Texas desired this, but because it was "our manifest destiny to overspread the continent allotted by Providence for the free development of our yearly multiplying millions". Overcoming Whig opposition, Democrats annexed Texas in 1845. O'Sullivan's first usage of the phrase "manifest destiny" attracted little attention.

O'Sullivan's second use of the phrase became extremely influential. On December 27, 1845, in his newspaper the New York Morning News, O'Sullivan addressed the ongoing boundary dispute with Britain. O'Sullivan argued that the United States had the right to claim "the whole of Oregon":
And that claim is by the right of our manifest destiny to overspread and to possess the whole of the continent which Providence has given us for the development of the great experiment of liberty and federated self-government entrusted to us.

That is, O'Sullivan believed that Providence had given the United States a mission to spread republican democracy ("the great experiment of liberty"). Because the British government would not spread democracy, thought O'Sullivan, British claims to the territory should be overruled. O'Sullivan believed that manifest destiny was a moral ideal (a "higher law") that superseded other considerations.

O'Sullivan's original conception of manifest destiny was not a call for territorial expansion by force. He believed that the expansion of the United States would happen without the direction of the U.S. government or the involvement of the military. After Americans immigrated to new regions, they would set up new democratic governments, and then seek admission to the United States, as Texas had done. In 1845, O'Sullivan predicted that California would follow this pattern next, and that Canada would eventually request annexation as well. He disapproved of the Mexican–American War in 1846, although he came to believe that the outcome would be beneficial to both countries.

Ironically, O'Sullivan's term became popular only after it was criticized by Whig opponents of the Polk administration. Whigs denounced manifest destiny, arguing, "that the designers and supporters of schemes of conquest, to be carried on by this government, are engaged in treason to our Constitution and Declaration of Rights, giving aid and comfort to the enemies of republicanism, in that they are advocating and preaching the doctrine of the right of conquest". On January 3, 1846, Representative Robert Winthrop ridiculed the concept in Congress, saying "I suppose the right of a manifest destiny to spread will not be admitted to exist in any nation except the universal Yankee nation." Winthrop was the first in a long line of critics who suggested that advocates of manifest destiny were citing "Divine Providence" for justification of actions that were motivated by chauvinism and self-interest. Despite this criticism, expansionists embraced the phrase, which caught on so quickly that its origin was soon forgotten.

Themes and influences 

Historian Frederick Merk wrote in 1963 that the concept of Manifest destiny was born out of "a sense of mission to redeem the Old World by high example ... generated by the potentialities of a new earth for building a new heaven". Merks also states that Manifest destiny was heavily contested concept within the nation:

From the outset Manifest Destiny—vast in program, in its sense of continentalism—was slight in support. It lacked national, sectional, or party following commensurate with its magnitude. The reason was it did not reflect the national spirit. The thesis that it embodied nationalism, found in much historical writing, is backed by little real supporting evidence.

The major ideas of manifest destiny can be traced to the original ideology of the 15th-Century decree of the Doctrine of Christian Discover. Historian Nick Estes links the 15-th century the catholic churches Doctrine of distinguishing Christians from Non-Christians in the expansion of European nations. Estes and international jurist Tonya Gonnella Frichner further link the doctrine of discovery to Johnson v. M'Intosh and frame their arguments on the correlation between Manifest Destiny and Doctrine of Christian Discovery by using the statement made by Chief Justice John Marshall during the case, as he "spelled out the rights of the United states to Indigenous lands" and drew upon the Doctrine of Christian Discovery for his statement. John Marshall ruled on the case that "indigenous peoples possess 'occupancy' rights, meaning their lands could be taken by the powers of 'discovery'". Frichner explains that "The newly formed United States needed to manufacture an American Indian political identity and concept of Indian land that would open the way for united states and westward colonial expansion." In this way, Manifest Destiny was inspired by the original European colonization of the Americas, and it excuses U.S. violence against Indigenous Nations.

Another possible influence is racial predominance, namely the idea that the American Anglo-Saxon race was "separate, innately superior" and "destined to bring good government, commercial prosperity and Christianity to the American continents and the world". Author Reginald Horsman wrote in 1981, this view also held that "inferior races were doomed to subordinate status or extinction." and that this was used to justify "the enslavement of the blacks and the expulsion and possible extermination of the Indians".

Historian William E. Weeks noted in 1996 that three key themes were usually touched upon by advocates of manifest destiny:
 the virtue of the American people and their institutions;
 the mission to spread these institutions, thereby redeeming and remaking the world in the image of the United States;
 the destiny under God to do this work.

The origin of the first theme, later known as American exceptionalism, was often traced to America's Puritan heritage, particularly John Winthrop's famous "City upon a Hill" sermon of 1630, in which he called for the establishment of a virtuous community that would be a shining example to the Old World. In his influential 1776 pamphlet Common Sense, Thomas Paine echoed this notion, arguing that the American Revolution provided an opportunity to create a new, better society:
We have it in our power to begin the world over again. A situation, similar to the present, hath not happened since the days of Noah until now. The birthday of a new world is at hand...

Many Americans agreed with Paine, and came to believe that the United States' virtue was a result of its special experiment in freedom and democracy. Thomas Jefferson, in a letter to James Monroe, wrote, "it is impossible not to look forward to distant times when our rapid multiplication will expand itself beyond those limits, and cover the whole northern, if not the southern continent." To Americans in the decades that followed their proclaimed freedom for mankind, embodied in the Declaration of Independence, could only be described as the inauguration of "a new time scale" because the world would look back and define history as events that took place before, and after, the Declaration of Independence. It followed that Americans owed to the world an obligation to expand and preserve these beliefs.

The second theme's origination is less precise. A popular expression of America's mission was elaborated by President Abraham Lincoln's description in his December 1, 1862, message to Congress. He described the United States as "the last, best hope of Earth". The "mission" of the United States was further elaborated during Lincoln's Gettysburg Address, in which he interpreted the American Civil War as a struggle to determine if any nation with democratic ideals could survive; this has been called by historian Robert Johannsen "the most enduring statement of America's Manifest Destiny and mission".

The third theme can be viewed as a natural outgrowth of the belief that God had a direct influence in the foundation and further actions of the United States. Clinton Rossiter, a scholar, described this view as summing "that God, at the proper stage in the march of history, called forth certain hardy souls from the old and privilege-ridden nations ... and that in bestowing his grace He also bestowed a peculiar responsibility". Americans presupposed that they were not only divinely elected to maintain the North American continent, but also to "spread abroad the fundamental principles stated in the Bill of Rights". In many cases this meant neighboring colonial holdings and countries were seen as obstacles rather than the destiny God had provided the United States.

Faragher's 1997 analysis of the political polarization between the Democratic Party and the Whig Party is that:

Alternative interpretations 
With the Louisiana Purchase in 1803, which doubled the size of the United States, Thomas Jefferson set the stage for the continental expansion of the United States. Many began to see this as the beginning of a new providential mission: If the United States was successful as a "shining city upon a hill", people in other countries would seek to establish their own democratic republics.

Not all Americans or their political leaders believed that the United States was a divinely favored nation, or thought that it ought to expand. For example, many Whigs opposed territorial expansion based on the Democratic claim that the United States was destined to serve as a virtuous example to the rest of the world, and also had a divine obligation to spread its superordinate political system and a way of life throughout North American continent. Many in the Whig party "were fearful of spreading out too widely", and they "adhered to the concentration of national authority in a limited area". In July 1848, Alexander Stephens denounced President Polk's expansionist interpretation of America's future as "mendacious".

Ulysses S. Grant, served in the war with Mexico and later wrote:
I was bitterly opposed to the measure [to annex Texas], and to this day regard the war [with Mexico] which resulted as one of the most unjust ever waged by a stronger against a weaker nation. It was an instance of a republic following the bad example of European monarchies, in not considering justice in their desire to acquire additional territory.

In the mid‑19th century, expansionism, especially southward toward Cuba, also faced opposition from those Americans who were trying to abolish slavery. As more territory was added to the United States in the following decades, "extending the area of freedom" in the minds of southerners also meant extending the institution of slavery. That is why slavery became one of the central issues in the continental expansion of the United States before the Civil War.

Before and during the Civil War both sides claimed that America's destiny was rightfully their own. Lincoln opposed anti-immigrant nativism, and the imperialism of manifest destiny as both unjust and unreasonable. He objected to the Mexican war and believed each of these disordered forms of patriotism threatened the inseparable moral and fraternal bonds of liberty and union that he sought to perpetuate through a patriotic love of country guided by wisdom and critical self-awareness. Lincoln's "Eulogy to Henry Clay", June 6, 1852, provides the most cogent expression of his reflective patriotism.

Era of continental expansion 

The phrase "manifest destiny" is most often associated with the territorial expansion of the United States from 1812 to 1867. This era, from the War of 1812 to the acquisition of Alaska in 1867, has been called the "age of manifest destiny". During this time, the United States expanded to the Pacific Ocean—"from sea to shining sea"—largely defining the borders of the continental United States as they are today.

War of 1812 

One of the goals of the War of 1812 was to threaten to annex the British colony of Lower Canada as a bargaining chip to force the British to abandon their fortifications in the Northwestern United States and support for the various Native American tribes residing there. The result of this overoptimism was a series of defeats in 1812 in part due to the wide use of poorly-trained state militias rather than regular troops. The American victories at the Battle of Lake Erie and the Battle of the Thames in 1813 ended the Indian raids and removed the main reason for threatening annexation. To end the War of 1812 John Quincy Adams, Henry Clay and Albert Gallatin (former treasury secretary and a leading expert on Indians) and the other American diplomats negotiated the Treaty of Ghent in 1814 with Britain. They rejected the British plan to set up an Indian state in U.S. territory south of the Great Lakes. They explained the American policy toward acquisition of Indian lands:

A shocked Henry Goulburn, one of the British negotiators at Ghent, remarked, after coming to understand the American position on taking the Indians' land:

Continentalism 
The 19th-century belief that the United States would eventually encompass all of North America is known as "continentalism". An early proponent of this idea, Adams became a leading figure in U.S. expansion between the Louisiana Purchase in 1803 and the Polk administration in the 1840s. In 1811, Adams wrote to his father:

The whole continent of North America appears to be destined by Divine Providence to be peopled by one nation, speaking one language, professing one general system of religious and political principles, and accustomed to one general tenor of social usages and customs. For the common happiness of them all, for their peace and prosperity, I believe it is indispensable that they should be associated in one federal Union.

Adams did much to further this idea. He orchestrated the Treaty of 1818, which established the Canada–U.S. border as far west as the Rocky Mountains, and provided for the joint occupation of the region known in American history as the Oregon Country and in British and Canadian history as the New Caledonia and Columbia Districts. He negotiated the Transcontinental Treaty in 1819, transferring Florida from Spain to the United States and extending the U.S. border with Spanish Mexico all the way to the Pacific Ocean. And he formulated the Monroe Doctrine of 1823, which warned Europe that the Western Hemisphere was no longer open for European colonization.

The Monroe Doctrine and "manifest destiny" formed a closely related nexus of principles: historian Walter McDougall calls manifest destiny a corollary of the Monroe Doctrine, because while the Monroe Doctrine did not specify expansion, expansion was necessary in order to enforce the doctrine. Concerns in the United States that European powers were seeking to acquire colonies or greater influence in North America led to calls for expansion in order to prevent this. In his influential 1935 study of manifest destiny, done in conjunction with the Walter Hines Page School of International Relations, Albert Weinberg wrote: "the expansionism of the [1830s] arose as a defensive effort to forestall the encroachment of Europe in North America".

Transcontinental Railroad 
Manifest destiny played an important role in the development of the transcontinental railroad. The transcontinental railroad system is often used in manifest destiny imagery like John Gast's painting, American Progress where multiple locomotives are seen traveling west. According to academic Dina Gilio-Whitaker, "the transcontinental railroads not only enabled [U.S. control over the continent] but also accelerated it exponentially." Historian Boyd Cothran says that "modern transportation development and abundant resource exploitation gave rise to an appropriation of indigenous land, [and] resources."

All Oregon 
Manifest destiny played its most important role in the Oregon boundary dispute between the United States and Britain, when the phrase "manifest destiny" originated. The Anglo-American Convention of 1818 had provided for the joint occupation of the Oregon Country, and thousands of Americans migrated there in the 1840s over the Oregon Trail. The British rejected a proposal by U.S. President John Tyler (in office 1841–1845) to divide the region along the 49th parallel, and instead proposed a boundary line farther south, along the Columbia River, which would have made most of what later became the state of Washington part of their colonies in North America. Advocates of manifest destiny protested and called for the annexation of the entire Oregon Country up to the Alaska line (54°40ʹ N). Presidential candidate Polk used this popular outcry to his advantage, and the Democrats called for the annexation of "All Oregon" in the 1844 U.S. presidential election.

As president, Polk sought compromise and renewed the earlier offer to divide the territory in half along the 49th parallel, to the dismay of the most ardent advocates of manifest destiny. When the British refused the offer, American expansionists responded with slogans such as "The whole of Oregon or none" and "Fifty-four forty or fight", referring to the northern border of the region. (The latter slogan is often mistakenly described as having been a part of the 1844 presidential campaign.) When Polk moved to terminate the joint occupation agreement, the British finally agreed in early 1846 to divide the region along the 49th parallel, leaving the lower Columbia basin as part of the United States. The Oregon Treaty of 1846 formally settled the dispute; Polk's administration succeeded in selling the treaty to Congress because the United States was about to begin the Mexican–American War, and the president and others argued it would be foolish to also fight the British Empire.

Despite the earlier clamor for "All Oregon", the Oregon Treaty was popular in the United States and was easily ratified by the Senate. The most fervent advocates of manifest destiny had not prevailed along the northern border because, according to Reginald Stuart, "the compass of manifest destiny pointed west and southwest, not north, despite the use of the term 'continentalism.

In 1869, American historian Frances Fuller Victor published Manifest Destiny in the West in the Overland Monthly, arguing that the efforts of early American fur traders and missionaries presaged American control of Oregon. She concluded the article as follows:

Mexico and Texas 
Manifest destiny played an important role in the expansion of Texas and American relationship with Mexico. In 1836, the Republic of Texas declared independence from Mexico and, after the Texas Revolution, sought to join the United States as a new state. This was an idealized process of expansion that had been advocated from Jefferson to O'Sullivan: newly democratic and independent states would request entry into the United States, rather than the United States extending its government over people who did not want it. The annexation of Texas was attacked by anti-slavery spokesmen because it would add another slave state to the Union. Presidents Andrew Jackson and Martin Van Buren declined Texas's offer to join the United States in part because the slavery issue threatened to divide the Democratic Party.

Before the election of 1844, Whig candidate Henry Clay and the presumed Democratic candidate, former president, Van Buren, both declared themselves opposed to the annexation of Texas, each hoping to keep the troublesome topic from becoming a campaign issue. This unexpectedly led to Van Buren being dropped by the Democrats in favor of Polk, who favored annexation. Polk tied the Texas annexation question with the Oregon dispute, thus providing a sort of regional compromise on expansion. (Expansionists in the North were more inclined to promote the occupation of Oregon, while Southern expansionists focused primarily on the annexation of Texas.) Although elected by a very slim margin, Polk proceeded as if his victory had been a mandate for expansion.

All of Mexico 

After the election of Polk, but before he took office, Congress approved the annexation of Texas. Polk moved to occupy a portion of Texas that had declared independence from Mexico in 1836, but was still claimed by Mexico. This paved the way for the outbreak of the Mexican–American War on April 24, 1846. With American successes on the battlefield, by the summer of 1847 there were calls for the annexation of "All Mexico", particularly among Eastern Democrats, who argued that bringing Mexico into the Union was the best way to ensure future peace in the region.

This was a controversial proposition for two reasons. First, idealistic advocates of manifest destiny like O'Sullivan had always maintained that the laws of the United States should not be imposed on people against their will. The annexation of "All Mexico" would be a violation of this principle. And secondly, the annexation of Mexico was controversial because it would mean extending U.S. citizenship to millions of Mexicans, who were of dark skin and majority Catholic. Senator John C. Calhoun of South Carolina, who had approved of the annexation of Texas, was opposed to the annexation of Mexico, as well as the "mission" aspect of manifest destiny, for racial reasons. He made these views clear in a speech to Congress on January 4, 1848:

We have never dreamt of incorporating into our Union any but the Caucasian race—the free white race. To incorporate Mexico, would be the very first instance of the kind, of incorporating an Indian race; for more than half of the Mexicans are Indians, and the other is composed chiefly of mixed tribes. I protest against such a union as that! Ours, sir, is the Government of a white race.... We are anxious to force free government on all; and I see that it has been urged ... that it is the mission of this country to spread civil and religious liberty over all the world, and especially over this continent. It is a great mistake.Merry, Robert W. A Country of Vast Designs: James K. Polk, the Mexican War, and the Conquest of the American Continent. New York: Simon & Schuster 2009, pp. 414–15

This debate brought to the forefront one of the contradictions of manifest destiny: on the one hand, while identitarian ideas inherent in manifest destiny suggested that Mexicans, as non-whites, would present a threat to white racial integrity and thus were not qualified to become Americans, the "mission" component of manifest destiny suggested that Mexicans would be improved (or "regenerated", as it was then described) by bringing them into American democracy. Identitarianism was used to promote manifest destiny, but, as in the case of Calhoun and the resistance to the "All Mexico" movement, identitarianism was also used to oppose manifest destiny. Conversely, proponents of annexation of "All Mexico" regarded it as an anti-slavery measure.

The controversy was eventually ended by the Mexican Cession, which added the territories of Alta California and Nuevo México to the United States, both more sparsely populated than the rest of Mexico. Like the "All Oregon" movement, the "All Mexico" movement quickly abated.

Historian Frederick Merk, in Manifest Destiny and Mission in American History: A Reinterpretation (1963), argued that the failure of the "All Oregon" and "All Mexico" movements indicates that manifest destiny had not been as popular as historians have traditionally portrayed it to have been. Merk wrote that, while belief in the beneficent mission of democracy was central to American history, aggressive "continentalism" were aberrations supported by only a minority of Americans, all of them Democrats. Some Democrats were also opposed; the Democrats of Louisiana opposed annexation of Mexico, while those in Mississippi supported it.

These events related to the Mexican–American War and had an effect on the American people living in the Southern Plains at the time. A case study by David Beyreis depicts these effects through the operations of a fur trading and Indian trading business named Bent, St. Vrain and Company during the period. The telling of this company shows that the idea of Manifest Destiny was not unanimously loved by all Americans and did not always benefit Americans. The case study goes on to show that this company could have ceased to exist in the name of territorial expansion.

Filibusterism 
After the Mexican–American War ended in 1848, disagreements over the expansion of slavery made further annexation by conquest too divisive to be official government policy. Some, such as John Quitman, Governor of Mississippi, offered what public support they could. In one memorable case, Quitman simply explained that the state of Mississippi had "lost" its state arsenal, which began showing up in the hands of filibusters. Yet these isolated cases only solidified opposition in the North as many Northerners were increasingly opposed to what they believed to be efforts by Southern slave owners—and their friends in the North—to expand slavery through filibustering. Sarah P. Remond on January 24, 1859, delivered an impassioned speech at Warrington, England, that the connection between filibustering and slave power was clear proof of "the mass of corruption that underlay the whole system of American government". The Wilmot Proviso and the continued "Slave Power" narratives thereafter, indicated the degree to which manifest destiny had become part of the sectional controversy.

Without official government support the most radical advocates of manifest destiny increasingly turned to military filibustering. Originally filibuster had come from the Dutch vrijbuiter and referred to buccaneers in the West Indies that preyed on Spanish commerce. While there had been some filibustering expeditions into Canada in the late 1830s, it was only by mid-century did filibuster become a definitive term. By then, declared the New-York Daily Times "the fever of Fillibusterism is on our country. Her pulse beats like a hammer at the wrist, and there's a very high color on her face." Millard Fillmore's second annual message to Congress, submitted in December 1851, gave double the amount of space to filibustering activities than the brewing sectional conflict. The eagerness of the filibusters, and the public to support them, had an international hue. Clay's son, a diplomat in Portugal, reported that the invasion created a sensation in Lisbon.

Although they were illegal, filibustering operations in the late 1840s and early 1850s were romanticized in the United States. The Democratic Party's national platform included a plank that specifically endorsed William Walker's filibustering in Nicaragua. Wealthy American expansionists financed dozens of expeditions, usually based out of New Orleans, New York, and San Francisco. The primary target of manifest destiny's filibusters was Latin America but there were isolated incidents elsewhere. Mexico was a favorite target of organizations devoted to filibustering, like the Knights of the Golden Circle. William Walker got his start as a filibuster in an ill-advised attempt to separate the Mexican states Sonora and Baja California. Narciso López, a near second in fame and success, spent his efforts trying to secure Cuba from the Spanish Empire.

The United States had long been interested in acquiring Cuba from the declining Spanish Empire. As with Texas, Oregon, and California, American policy makers were concerned that Cuba would fall into British hands, which, according to the thinking of the Monroe Doctrine, would constitute a threat to the interests of the United States. Prompted by O'Sullivan, in 1848 President Polk offered to buy Cuba from Spain for $100 million. Polk feared that filibustering would hurt his effort to buy the island, and so he informed the Spanish of an attempt by the Cuban filibuster López to seize Cuba by force and annex it to the United States, foiling the plot. Spain declined to sell the island, which ended Polk's efforts to acquire Cuba. O'Sullivan eventually landed in legal trouble.

Filibustering continued to be a major concern for presidents after Polk. Whigs presidents Zachary Taylor and Millard Fillmore tried to suppress the expeditions. When the Democrats recaptured the White House in 1852 with the election of Franklin Pierce, a filibustering effort by John A. Quitman to acquire Cuba received the tentative support of the president. Pierce backed off and instead renewed the offer to buy the island, this time for $130 million. When the public learned of the Ostend Manifesto in 1854, which argued that the United States could seize Cuba by force if Spain refused to sell, this effectively killed the effort to acquire the island. The public now linked expansion with slavery; if manifest destiny had once enjoyed widespread popular approval, this was no longer true.

Filibusters like William Walker continued to garner headlines in the late 1850s, but to little effect. Expansionism was among the various issues that played a role in the coming of the war. With the divisive question of the expansion of slavery, Northerners and Southerners, in effect, were coming to define manifest destiny in different ways, undermining nationalism as a unifying force. According to Frederick Merk, "The doctrine of Manifest Destiny, which in the 1840s had seemed Heaven-sent, proved to have been a bomb wrapped up in idealism."

The filibusterism of the era even opened itself up to some mockery among the headlines. In 1854, a San Francisco Newspaper published a satirical poem called "Filibustering Ethics". This poem features two characters, Captain Robb and Farmer Cobb. Captain Robb makes claim to Farmer Cobb's land arguing that Robb deserves the land because he is Anglo-Saxon, has weapons to "blow out" Cobb's brains, and nobody has heard of Cobb so what right does Cobb have to claim the land. Cobb argues that Robb doesn't need his land because Robb already has more land than he knows what to do with. Due to threats of violence, Cobb surrenders his land and leaves grumbling that "might should be the rule of right among enlightened nations."

Homestead Act 

The Homestead Act of 1862 encouraged 600,000 families to settle the West by giving them land (usually 160 acres) almost free. Over the course of 123 years, 200 million claims were made and over 270 million acres were settled, accounting for 10% of the land in the U.S. They had to live on and improve the land for five years. Before the American Civil War, Southern leaders opposed the Homestead Acts because they feared it would lead to more free states and free territories. After the mass resignation of Southern senators and representatives at the beginning of the war, Congress was subsequently able to pass the Homestead Act.

In some areas, the Homestead Act resulted in the direct removal of Indigenous communities. According to American historian Roxanne Dunbar-Ortiz, all five nations of the "Five Civilized Tribes" signed treaties with the Confederacy and initially supported them in hopes of dividing and weakening the U.S so that they could remain on their land. The United States Army, led by prominent Civil War generals such as William Tecumseh Sherman, Philip Sheridan, and George Armstrong Custer, waged wars on "non-treaty Indians" who continued to live on land that had already been ceded to the U.S. through treaty. Homesteaders and other settlers soon followed and took possession of the land for farms and mining. Occasionally, white settlers would move ahead of the U.S. Army, into land that had not yet been settled by the United States, causing conflict with the Native people who still resided there. According to Anglo-American historian Julius Wilm, while the U.S. government did not approve of settlers moving ahead of the army, Indian Affairs officials did believe "the move of frontier whites into the proximity of contested territory—be they homesteaders or parties interested in other pursuits—necessitated the removal of Indigenous nations."

According to historian Hannah Anderson, the Homestead Act also lead to environmental degradation. While it succeeded in settling and farming the land, the Act failed to preserve the land. Continuous plowing of the top soil made the soil vulnerable to erosion and wind, as well as stripping the nutrients from the ground. This deforestation and erosion would play a key role in the Dust Bowl in the 1930s. Intense logging caused a decrease in much of the forests and hunting harmed many of the native animal populations, including the buffalo whose population was reduced to hundreds.

Acquisition of Alaska 

The final U.S. territorial expansion of the North American mainland came in 1867 when the U.S. negotiated with the Russian Empire to purchase Alaska. In the aftermath of the Crimean War in the 1850s, Emperor Alexander II of Russia decided to relinquish control of the ailing Russian America (present-day Alaska) on fears that the territory would be easily be taken over by Canada in any future war between Russia and the United Kingdom. Following the end of the Civil War in 1865, U.S. Secretary of State William H. Seward entered into negotiations with Russian minister Eduard de Stoeckl for the purchase of Alaska. Seward initially offered $5 million to Stoeckl; the two men settled on $7 million and on March 15, 1867, Seward presented a draft treaty to the U.S. Cabinet. Stoeckl's superiors raised several concerns; to induce him to waive them, the final purchase price was increased to $7.2 million and on March 30, the treaty was ratified by the U.S. Senate. The transfer ceremony took place in Sitka, Alaska on October 18. Russian and American soldiers paraded in front of the governor's house; the Russian flag was lowered and the American flag raised amid peals of artillery.

The purchase added  of new territory to the United States, an area about twice the size of Texas. Reactions to the purchase in the United States were mostly positive, as many believed the possession of Alaska would serve as a base to expand American trade in Asia. Some opponents labeled the purchase as "Seward's Folly", or "Seward's Icebox", as they contended that the United States had acquired useless land. Nearly all Russian settlers left Alaska in the aftermath of the purchase; Alaska would remain sparsely populated until the Klondike Gold Rush began in 1896. Originally organized as the Department of Alaska, the area was renamed the District of Alaska and the Territory of Alaska before becoming the modern State of Alaska in 1959.

The start of the Klondike Gold Rush brought 200,000 prospectors to Alaska. The gold rush greatly increased the U.S. government's commitment to developing the industrial infrastructure, and in turn attracting new residents to maintain it. The increase in gold seekers brought epidemics and land conflicts between settlers and Indigenous Alaskans. According to Yupik historian Shari Huhndorf, "These changing demographics transformed social relationships between Native and the newcomers and soon led to Jim Crow-like segregation supported by a rapidly expanding territorial government."

In 1905, the Nelson Act was passed, which allowed the Territory of Alaska to open schools outside of incorporated towns and run them outside of the federal Bureau of Education's control. According to historian Carol Barnhardt, the Territory of Alaska opened schools for "white children and children of mixed blood leading a civilized life," while schools for Native children were still run by the Bureau of Education, which operated with the belief that it was important to transform Native Alaskans, along with all Indigenous people in America, into civilized Christians. The U.S. government saw education as the most effective way to achieve this goal. Overall, there was little recognition of the important differences between different groups of Indigenous people. The federal Bureau of Education also extended services such as medical services, cooperative stores, and a ship to supply remote coastal villages, slowly reducing the self-sufficiency of Native communities and allowing the U.S. government to assume more control of the lives of Native Alaskans. The effects of the Alaska Purchase are still felt by Native Alaskans. According to Inuit author Sheila Watt-Cloutier, "The land that is such an important part of our spirit, our culture, and our physical and economic well-being is becoming an often unpredictable and precarious place for us."

Native Americans

Manifest destiny had serious consequences for Native Americans, since continental expansion implicitly meant the occupation and annexation of Native American land, sometimes to expand slavery. This ultimately led to confrontations and wars with several groups of native peoples via Indian removal. The United States continued the European practice of recognizing only limited land rights of indigenous peoples. In a policy formulated largely by Henry Knox, Secretary of War in the Washington Administration, the U.S. government sought to expand into the west through the purchase of Native American land in treaties. Only the Federal Government could purchase Indian lands and this was done through treaties with tribal leaders. Whether a tribe actually had a decision-making structure capable of making a treaty was a controversial issue. The national policy was for the Indians to join American society and become "civilized", which meant no more wars with neighboring tribes or raids on white settlers or travelers, and a shift from hunting to farming and ranching. Advocates of civilization programs believed that the process of settling native tribes would greatly reduce the amount of land needed by the Native Americans, making more land available for homesteading by white Americans. Thomas Jefferson believed that, while the Indigenous people of America were intellectual equals to whites, they had to assimilate to and live like the whites or inevitably be pushed aside by them.

According to historian Jeffrey Ostler, Jefferson believed that once assimilation was no longer possible, he advocated for the extermination of Indigenous people.
On 27 February 1803, Jefferson wrote in a letter to William Henry Harrison:"but this letter being unofficial, & private, I may with safety give you a more extensive view of our policy respecting the Indians... Our system is to live in perpetual peace with the Indians, to cultivate an affectionate attachment from them, by everything just & liberal which we can do for them within the bounds of reason, and by giving them effectual protection against wrongs from our own people. The decrease of game rendering their subsistence by hunting insufficient, we wish to draw them to agriculture, to spinning & weaving... when they withdraw themselves to the culture of a small piece of land, they will perceive how useless to them are their extensive forests, and will be willing to pare them off from time to time in exchange for necessaries for their farms & families. At our trading houses too we mean to sell so low as merely to repay us cost and charges so as neither to lessen or enlarge our capital. this is what private traders cannot do, for they must gain; they will consequently retire from the competition, & we shall thus get clear of this pest without giving offence or umbrage to the Indians. in this way our settlements will gradually circumbscribe & approach the Indians, & they will in time either incorporate with us as citizens of the U.S. or remove beyond the Mississippi."Noted by Law Scholar and professor Robert J. Miller, Thomas Jefferson "Understood and utilized the Doctrine of Discovery [aka Manifest destiny] through his political careers and was heavily involved in using the Doctrine against Indian tribes." Jefferson was "often immersed in Indian affairs through his legal and political careers" and "was also well acquainted with the process Virginia governments had historically used to extinguish Indian [land] titles". Jefferson used this knowledge to make the Louisiana purchase in 1803, aided in the construction of the Indian Removal Policy, and laid the ground work for removing Native American tribes further and further into eventual small reservation territories.

The idea of "Indian removal" gained traction in the context of manifest destiny and, with Jefferson as one of the main political voices on the subject, accumulated advocates who believed that American Indians would be better off moving away from white settlers. The removal effort was further solidified through policy by Andrew Jackson when he signed the Indian Removal Act in 1830. In his First Annual Message to Congress in 1829, Jackson stated with regards to removal: I suggest for your consideration the propriety of setting apart an ample district west of the Mississippi, and without the limits of any state or territory now formed, to be guaranteed to the Indian tribes as long as they shall occupy it, each tribe having a distinct control over the portion designated for its use. There they may be secured in the enjoyment of governments of their own choice, subject to no other control from the United States than such as may be necessary to preserve peace on the frontier and between the several tribes. There the benevolent may endeavor to teach them the arts of civilization, and, by promoting union and harmony among them, to raise up an interesting commonwealth, destined to perpetuate the race and to attest the humanity and justice of this government."

After major exploration and colonization to the western parts of the United States, resources and industry were needed to support such colonies. Colville scholar Dina Gilo-Whitaker outlines how during this process, promises of innovative technologies and abundant resources were made to indigenous people as the settlers effectively began damming rivers, imposing railways, and seeking natural resources and minerals through mining and excavation of Native American lands. According to historians Boyd Cothran and Ned Blackhawk, this influx of trade, industrialization, and development of transportation corridors killed surrounding livestock, caused waterway damage, and created sickness and disease for the Native American peoples living in those regions.

Historian Jeffery Ostler comments on some of the general theories about native American population decline due to these environmental factors. He shows that, over the course of this period, there were many forces "of destruction, including enslavement, disease, material deprivation, malnutrition, and social stress."

Following the forced removal of many Indigenous Peoples, Americans increasingly believed that Native American ways of life would eventually disappear as the United States expanded. Humanitarian advocates of removal believed that American Indians would be better off moving away from whites. As historian Reginald Horsman argued in his influential study Race and Manifest Destiny, racial rhetoric increased during the era of manifest destiny. Americans increasingly believed that Native American ways of life would "fade away" as the United States expanded. As an example, this idea was reflected in the work of one of America's first great historians, Francis Parkman, whose landmark book The Conspiracy of Pontiac was published in 1851. Parkman wrote that after the French defeat in the French and Indian War, Indians were "destined to melt and vanish before the advancing waves of Anglo-American power, which now rolled westward unchecked and unopposed". Parkman emphasized that the collapse of Indian power in the late 18th century had been swift and was a past event.

Indian removal policies led to the current day reservation system which allocated territories to individual tribes. According to scholar Dina Gilio-Whitaker, "the treaties also created reservations that would confine Native people into smaller territories far smaller than they had for millenia been accustomed to, diminishing their ability to feed themselves." According to author and scholar David Rich Lewis, these reservations had much higher population densities than indigenous homelands. As a result, "the consolidation of native peoples in the nineteenth century allowed epidemic diseases to rage through their communities." In addition to this "a result of changing subsistence patterns and environments-contributed to an explosion of dietary-related illness like diabetes, vitamin and mineral deficiencies, cirrhosis, obesity, gallbladder disease, hypertension, and hearth disease."

Beyond mainland North America

In 1859, Reuben Davis, a member of the House of Representatives from Mississippi, articulated one of the most expansive visions of Manifest Destiny on record:
We may expand so as to include the whole world. Mexico, Central America, South America, Cuba, the West India Islands, and even England and France [we] might annex without inconvenience... allowing them with their local Legislatures to regulate their local affairs in their own way. And this, Sir, is the mission of this Republic and its ultimate destiny.
As the Civil War faded into history, the term manifest destiny experienced a brief revival. Protestant missionary Josiah Strong, in his best-seller of 1885, Our Country, argued that the future was devolved upon America since it had perfected the ideals of civil liberty, "a pure spiritual Christianity", and concluded, "My plea is not, Save America for America's sake, but, Save America for the world's sake."

In the 1892 U.S. presidential election, the Republican Party platform proclaimed: "We reaffirm our approval of the Monroe doctrine and believe in the achievement of the manifest destiny of the Republic in its broadest sense." What was meant by "manifest destiny" in this context was not clearly defined, particularly since the Republicans lost the election.

In the 1896 election, the Republicans recaptured the White House and held on to it for the next 16 years. During that time, manifest destiny was cited to promote overseas expansion. Whether or not this version of manifest destiny was consistent with the continental expansionism of the 1840s was debated at the time, and long afterwards.

For example, when President William McKinley advocated annexation of the Republic of Hawaii in 1898, he said that "We need Hawaii just as much and a good deal more than we did California. It is manifest destiny." On the other hand, former President Grover Cleveland, a Democrat who had blocked the annexation of Hawaii during his administration, wrote that McKinley's annexation of the territory was a "perversion of our national destiny". Historians continued that debate; some have interpreted American acquisition of other Pacific island groups in the 1890s as an extension of manifest destiny across the Pacific Ocean. Others have regarded it as the antithesis of manifest destiny and merely imperialism.

Spanish–American War 

In 1898, the United States intervened in the Cuban insurrection and launched the Spanish–American War to force Spain out. According to the terms of the Treaty of Paris, Spain relinquished sovereignty over Cuba and ceded the Philippine Islands, Puerto Rico, and Guam to the United States. The terms of cession for the Philippines involved a payment of the sum of $20 million by the United States to Spain. The treaty was highly contentious and denounced by William Jennings Bryan, who tried to make it a central issue in the 1900 election. He was defeated in landslide by McKinley.

The Teller Amendment, passed unanimously by the U.S. Senate before the war, which proclaimed Cuba "free and independent", forestalled annexation of the island. The Platt Amendment (1902) then established Cuba as a virtual protectorate of the United States.

The acquisition of Guam, Puerto Rico, and the Philippines after the war with Spain marked a new chapter in U.S. history. Traditionally, territories were acquired by the United States for the purpose of becoming new states on equal footing with already existing states. These islands were acquired as colonies rather than prospective states. The process was validated by the Insular Cases. The Supreme Court ruled that full constitutional rights did not automatically extend to all areas under American control.

According to Frederick Merk, these colonial acquisitions marked a break from the original intention of manifest destiny. Previously, "Manifest Destiny had contained a principle so fundamental that a Calhoun and an O'Sullivan could agree on it—that a people not capable of rising to statehood should never be annexed. That was the principle thrown overboard by the imperialism of 1899." Albert J. Beveridge maintained the contrary at his September 25, 1900, speech in the Auditorium, at Chicago. He declared that the current desire for Cuba and the other acquired territories was identical to the views expressed by Washington, Jefferson and Marshall. Moreover, "the sovereignty of the Stars and Stripes can be nothing but a blessing to any people and to any land." The nascent revolutionary government, desirous of independence, resisted the United States in the Philippine–American War in 1899; it won no support from any government anywhere and collapsed when its leader was captured. William Jennings Bryan denounced the war and any form of future overseas expansion, writing, Destiny' is not as manifest as it was a few weeks ago."

In 1917, all Puerto Ricans were made full American citizens via the Jones Act, which also provided for a popularly elected legislature and a bill of rights, and authorized the election of a Resident Commissioner who has a voice (but no vote) in Congress. In 1934, the Tydings–McDuffie Act put the Philippines on a path to independence, which was realized in 1946 with the Treaty of Manila. The Guam Organic Act of 1950 established Guam alongside Puerto Rico as an unincorporated unorganized territory of the United States, provided for the structure of the island's civilian government, and granted the people U.S. citizenship.

Legacy and consequences 
The belief in an American mission to promote and defend democracy throughout the world, as expounded by Jefferson and his "Empire of Liberty", and continued by Lincoln, Wilson and George W. Bush, continues to have an influence on American political ideology. Under Douglas MacArthur, the Americans "were imbued with a sense of manifest destiny," says historian John Dower.

After the turn of the nineteenth century to the twentieth, the phrase manifest destiny declined in usage, as territorial expansion ceased to be promoted as being a part of America's "destiny". Under President Theodore Roosevelt the role of the United States in the New World was defined, in the 1904 Roosevelt Corollary to the Monroe Doctrine, as being an "international police power" to secure American interests in the Western Hemisphere. Roosevelt's corollary contained an explicit rejection of territorial expansion. In the past, manifest destiny had been seen as necessary to enforce the Monroe Doctrine in the Western Hemisphere, but now expansionism had been replaced by interventionism as a core value associated with the doctrine.

President Wilson continued the policy of interventionism in the Americas, and attempted to redefine both manifest destiny and America's "mission" on a broader, worldwide scale. Wilson led the United States into World War I with the argument that "The world must be made safe for democracy." In his 1920 message to Congress after the war, Wilson stated:
... I think we all realize that the day has come when Democracy is being put upon its final test. The Old World is just now suffering from a wanton rejection of the principle of democracy and a substitution of the principle of autocracy as asserted in the name, but without the authority and sanction, of the multitude. This is the time of all others when Democracy should prove its purity and its spiritual power to prevail. It is surely the manifest destiny of the United States to lead in the attempt to make this spirit prevail.

This was the only time a president had used the phrase "manifest destiny" in his annual address. Wilson's version of manifest destiny was a rejection of expansionism and an endorsement (in principle) of self-determination, emphasizing that the United States had a mission to be a world leader for the cause of democracy. This U.S. vision of itself as the leader of the "Free World" would grow stronger in the 20th century after World War II, although rarely would it be described as "manifest destiny", as Wilson had done.

"Manifest destiny" is sometimes used by critics of U.S. foreign policy to characterize interventions in the Middle East and elsewhere. In this usage, "manifest destiny" is interpreted as the underlying cause of what is denounced by some as "American imperialism". A more positive-sounding phrase devised by scholars at the end of the twentieth century is "nation building", and State Department official Karin Von Hippel notes that the U.S. has "been involved in nation-building and promoting democracy since the middle of the nineteenth century and 'Manifest Destiny.

According to the U.S. Holocaust Memorial Museum Encyclopedia, Adolf Hitler's Lebensraum was the "Manifest Destiny" for Germany's romanticization and imperial conquest of Eastern Europe. Hitler compared Nazi expansion to American expansion westward, saying, "there's only one duty: to Germanize this country [Russia] by the immigration of Germans and to look upon the natives as Redskins."

Environmental consequences 

Many studies suggest environmental changes that directly impact Indigenous communities as a result of European settlement, according to Colville scholar Dina Gilio-Whitaker, when manifest destiny reached California and Oregon, "Waters were diverted, interrupting farming practices: ancient food sources are eliminated: tribal self-determination was compromised with dams built on treaty adds: entire ecosystems were altered, interrupting cultural practices and dividing families: trauma inflicted by disruptions contributed to failing health conditions in tribal communities."

Further, "sudden loss of salmon-based economies and spiritual traditions was a seismic shock to cultures and psyches of the people who collectively call themselves Salmon People." "Specifically, 'The Karuk are a fishing people who have sustainably managed their Klamath River fishery through the use of ceremony and harvest techniques for tens of thousands of years. Since the arrival of non-Indians in the 1850s, however, the salmon populations have been damaged by overfishing and the degradation of their habitat." "Scholars such as environmental sociologist Kari Norgaard have shown that these issues continue into the present moment: "Ron Reed served as the Karuk tribal representative for the relicensing process. Reed became convinced that the lack of healthy food, specifically the loss of salmon, was directly affecting the health of his people, leading to high rates of diabetes, heart disease, and a decreased life expectancy."

Other environmental changes as a result of European settlement were discovered as a result of the pre-industrial era, according to historian Boyd Cothran, "It coincided with a national timber boom and the concurrent near exhaustion of the Great Lakes forests, leading American businesses to clamor for access to the vast timber stands located on many western Indian Reservations."

Biomolecular archaeologist Eric J. Guiry has shown that this deforestation had increasingly negative effects on Great Lakes ecosystems: 'in comparison with the industrial era..."Aquatic disruptions in great lakes have been linked to timber extraction through the loss of ecological resources. "Results show that, in comparison with the industrial era, the nitrogen cycle and trophic structure of the Great Lakes ecosystems remained remarkably stable until the 1830s, despite millennia of Indigenous agricultural and other land management, decades of European settlement, and climatic fluctuations. After this time, increased logging from forestry and agriculture induced soil erosion caused an unprecedented and abrupt bottom-up shift throughout the entire aquatic ecosystem of Lake Ontario."

Criticisms 
Some critics argue that manifest destiny claims that because of the special place of American society and the occupation of the western part of the American territory, its historical destiny is to be an exception. This belief leads to imperialist actions, among its consequences are the military invasion of Philippines and Cuba. These measures later took the form of a cultural justification of New Imperialism, and it was concluded that in the history and the present world, the United States has a place and status of "exception in the world". Accordingly, the United States is not accountable to international organizations such as the United Nations and the International Criminal Court. Therefore, the United States is beyond international treaties and does not have to commit to them.

Some contemporary historians have condemned manifest destiny as an ideology used to justify dispossession and genocide against Native Americans.

The United States has to-date not undertaken any truth commission nor built a memorial for the genocide of indigenous people. It does not acknowledge nor compensate for the historical violence against Native Americans that occurred during Manifest Destiny and territorial expansion to the west coast. American museums such as the Smithsonian Institution do not dedicate a section to the genocide. In 2013, the National Congress of American Indians passed a resolution to create a space for the National American Indian Holocaust Museum inside the Smithsonian but it has been ignored.

See also

 54°40' or fight!
 Christian mission
 Civilizing mission
 Discovery doctrine
 Frontierism
 Irredentism
 Liberal internationalism
 New Frontier
 Progress
 Right of conquest
 White man's burden
 Wilsonianism
 Young America movement

References

Citations

Sources 

 
 
 
 
 
 
 
 
 
 
  Previously published as

Further reading

Journal articles

Books 
 
 
 Cheathem, Mark R. and Terry Corps, eds. Historical Dictionary of the Jacksonian Era and Manifest Destiny (2nd ed. 2016), 544 pp
 
 
 
 
 
 
 McDonough, Matthew Davitian. Manifestly Uncertain Destiny: The Debate over American Expansionism, 1803–1848. PhD dissertation, Kansas State University, 2011.
 Merk, Frederick, and Lois Bannister Merk. Manifest Destiny and Mission in American History: A Reinterpretation. New York: Knopf, 1963.

External links 

 President Polk's Inaugural Address
 Collection: "Manifest Destiny and the American West" from the University of Michigan Museum of Art

1845 establishments in the United States
American exceptionalism
American nationalism
American political catchphrases
Geopolitics
History of North America
History of United States expansionism
Imperialism
International relations theory
Mexico–United States relations
Native American history
Political terminology of the United States
Politics of the United States
Territorial evolution of the United States
United States federal Indian policy
1840s neologisms
Internal migrations in the United States